Two ships and a shore establishment of the Royal Navy have been named HMS Ganges  after the river Ganges in India.

  was a 74-gun third-rate ship of the line launched in 1782 and broken up in 1816.
  was an 84-gun second rate launched in 1821 and finally broken up in 1930. She was the last sailing ship of the Navy to serve as a flagship.
  was a training establishment, originally aboard the second HMS Ganges.  She was in service between 1865 and 1976.  During this period a number of other ships were renamed HMS Ganges whilst serving as the establishment:
  was Ganges between 1906 and 1908, and again between 1913 and 1919.  She was also Ganges II between 1908 and 1912, and again between 1920 and 1922.
  was Ganges between 1908 and 1913.
  was Ganges II between 1906 and 1908.
 RNTE Shotley, a shore based training establishment set up in 1905 was Ganges II from 1913 to 1919, and Ganges from 1927 to 1976.

See also 
 Ganges (disambiguation) for other vessels
  for vessels named Ganges that served the British East India Company

Royal Navy ship names